Bloomville is a hamlet and census-designated place (CDP) in the town of Kortright, Delaware County, New York, United States. The population was 213 at the 2010 census.

Geography
Bloomville is located in the West Branch Delaware River valley, north of the Catskill Mountains. Bloomville is in the southwestern corner of Kortright.

New York State Route 10 passes through the hamlet, leading southwest  to Delhi, the county seat, and northeast  to Stamford.

The west end of the Catskill Scenic Trail, a rail-trail following the route of the former Ulster and Delaware Railroad, is in Bloomville. There is a parking lot just across Route 10 from the trailhead.

Demographics

Culture
Like many communities in the Catskills, the Bloomville population is split between farmers and second-home owners. The Bloomville Methodist Episcopal Church is located within the community.

Today Bloomville is part of a developing Catskills culinary community. A local restaurant, Table on Ten, was featured in Conde Nast Traveler and other culinary publications in 2014.

References

Census-designated places in New York (state)
Census-designated places in Delaware County, New York
Hamlets in New York (state)
Hamlets in Delaware County, New York